The 2015 World Judo Cadets Championships is an edition of the World Judo Cadets Championships, organised by the International Judo Federation. It was held in Sarajevo, Bosnia and Herzegovina from 5 to 9 August 2015. The final day of competition featured men's and women's team events, both won by team Japan.

Medal summary

Medal table

Men's events

Women's events

Source Results

References

External links
 

World Judo Cadets Championships
 U18
World Championships, U18
Judo
Judo
Judo, World Championships U18